Stefano Mitchell (born 22 September 1999) is a Antigua and Barbuda swimmer. He competed in the men's 50 metre butterfly event at the 2017 World Aquatics Championships. In 2019, he represented Antigua and Barbuda at the 2019 World Aquatics Championships held in Gwangju, South Korea and he finished in 62nd place in the heats in the men's 50 metre freestyle event.

He competed in the men's 100 metre freestyle event at the 2020 Summer Olympics.

In 2018, Mitchell was named the Antigua and Barbuda Sportsman of the Year.

References

External links

1999 births
Living people
Antigua and Barbuda male swimmers
Commonwealth Games competitors for Antigua and Barbuda
Swimmers at the 2018 Commonwealth Games
Swimmers at the 2022 Commonwealth Games
Male butterfly swimmers
Antigua and Barbuda male freestyle swimmers
Swimmers at the 2020 Summer Olympics
Olympic swimmers of Antigua and Barbuda
Swimmers from Toronto
Competitors at the 2018 Central American and Caribbean Games